Juvkam is a surname. Notable people with the surname include:

Lizzie Juvkam (1883–1969), Norwegian novelist
Per Juvkam (1907–2003), Norwegian Lutheran bishop